Bridge of Orchy railway station is a railway station in the village of Bridge of Orchy in the west of Scotland. The station is on the West Highland Line, between Rannoch and Upper Tyndrum,  from Craigendoran Junction, near Helensburgh. ScotRail manage the station and operate most services, with others provided by Caledonian Sleeper.

History 

This station opened by the West Highland Railway on 7 August 1894.

The station was laid out with a crossing loop around an island platform and sidings on the east side of the station.

The station was host to a LNER camping coach from 1935 to 1939 and possibly one for some of 1934.

On 1 February 1987, the crossing loop was altered to right-hand running. The original Down platform has thus become the Up platform, and vice versa. The change was made in order to simplify shunting at this station, by removing the need to hand-pump the train-operated loop points to access the sidings.

Signalling 
The signal box, which had 16 levers, was situated at the south end of the island platform. From the time of its opening in 1894, the West Highland Railway was worked throughout by the electric token system.

The Up loop at Bridge of Orchy was signalled for running in either direction and the signal box was able to 'switch out' when not required.

In August 1985, the method of working between Crianlarich and Rannoch reverted to the electric token block system. The semaphore signals were removed on 24 November 1985 in preparation for the introduction of Radio Electronic Token Block (RETB).

This resulted in the closure of Bridge of Orchy signal box (amongst others). The RETB is controlled from a Signalling Centre at Banavie railway station.

The Train Protection & Warning System was installed in 2003.

Facilities 

The island platform is only equipped with shelters and bike racks, although there is a car park. The only access to the station is via a stepped subway, so there is no step-free access. As there are no facilities to purchase tickets, passengers must buy one in advance, or from the guard on the train.

Passenger volume 

The statistics cover twelve month periods that start in April.

Services 
Monday to Saturday, Bridge of Orchy has three ScotRail services to Mallaig and three services to Glasgow Queen Street. Caledonian Sleeper operate one service each day, each way to Fort William and London Euston (except Saturday nights). On Sundays, there are two services northbound to Mallaig and two southbound to Glasgow Queen Street, as well as the Caledonian Sleeper to London Euston. This can also be used by regular travellers to and from stations towards Edinburgh, as it is booked to set down at some stations and carries seating coaches as far as Edinburgh.

References

Bibliography

External Links 

 Video footage of the station on YouTube

Railway stations in Argyll and Bute
Former North British Railway stations
Railway stations in Great Britain opened in 1894
Railway stations served by ScotRail
Railway stations served by Caledonian Sleeper
James Miller railway stations
Listed railway stations in Scotland
Category B listed buildings in Argyll and Bute